Pennellville  is a hamlet in Oswego County, New York, United States. It is located in the Town of Schroeppel. Its ZIP Code is 13132.  Elevation is 413 feet above Mean Sea Level.

History
The hamlet is named after Richard Pennell M.D., of New York. His wife inherited the land from her father, George C. Schroeppel. Running through the area was a stream, called by the local Indian tribe Ahinahtanaganus (translated: "big fish water") upon which, in 1833, Dr. Pennell commissioned a sawmill, which was built by Laren Seymour. 

The hamlet is part of the village of Phoenix School District.  There is a restaurant and music venue called Moniraes that brings in touring national acts.

The burial ground in the hamlet is the burial place of Dr. and Mrs. Pennell, and also Henry W. Schroeppel.

References

Hamlets in New York (state)
Syracuse metropolitan area
Hamlets in Oswego County, New York